The 2005–06 Michigan State Spartans men's basketball team represented Michigan State University in the 2005–06 NCAA Division I men's basketball season. Their head coach was Tom Izzo, who was in his 11th year at Michigan State. The team played its home games at Breslin Center in East Lansing, Michigan, and competed in the Big Ten Conference. MSU finished the season with a record of 22–12, 8–8 in Big Ten play to finish in a tie for sixth place. As the No. 6 seed in the Big Ten tournament, they defeated Purdue and Illinois before losing to Iowa in the semifinals.  They received an at-large bid to the NCAA tournament as the No. 6 seed in the Washington D.C. bracket, marking the school's ninth consecutive trip to the NCAA Tournament under Izzo. They lost in the First Round to eventual Final Four participant, George Mason.

Previous season 
The Spartans finished the 2004–05 season with a record of 26–7, 13–3 in Big Ten play to finish in second place. Michigan State received a No. 6 seed in the NCAA tournament, their eighth straight trip to the Tournament, and advanced to the Final Four, their fourth trip under Tom Izzo.

The Spartans lost Alan Anderson (13.2 points and 5.6 rebounds per game), Kelvin Torbert (9.5 points per game) and Chris Hill (8.8 points and 4.2 assists per game) to graduation following the season.

Season summary 
The Spartans were led by seniors Paul Davis (17.5 points and 9.1 rebounds per game) and Maurice Ager (19.3 points per game), as well as junior Shannon Brown (17.2 points per game).

The Spartans began the season ranked No. 4 in the country. They started by making a trip to Hawaii to participate in the Maui Classic. Before playing in the Classic, however, they played Hawaii and were shocked, losing 84–62. After beating host Chaminade in the Maui Classic, they played No. 8 Gonzaga led by Adam Morrison in the tournament semifinals. The game was an instant classic lasting into triple overtime where the Spartans fell 109–106. In the third place game, the Spartans defeated No. 9 Arizona. The Spartans won their remaining ten non-conference games, including a win over No. 6 Boston College in the Jimmy V Classic, to finish the non-conference schedule at 12–2 and ranked No. 7 in the country.

The Spartans began the Big Ten season with back-to-back losses to No. 6 Illinois and Wisconsin. They followed those up with wins over No. 9 Indiana, No. 19 Ohio State in double overtime, and No. 23 Iowa. However, Michigan State finished the conference season losing five of their last seven games. MSU finished the Big Ten regular season with a conference record of 8–8, 20–10 overall, and slipping out of the polls. In the Big Ten tournament, MSU defeated Purdue and No. 9 Illinois before losing to No. 20 Iowa in the semifinals.

The Spartans received an at-large bid as a No. 6 seed in the NCAA tournament, their ninth consecutive trip to the Tournament. In the Tournament, they lost to eventual Final Four Cinderella, No. 11-seeded George Mason, in the First Round.

Following the season, Shannon Brown declared for the NBA draft, leaving the Spartans one year prior to graduation, just the fourth player under Izzo to declare early.

Roster

Schedule and results

|-
!colspan=9 style=| Exhibition Games

|-
!colspan=9 style=| Non-conference regular season

|-
!colspan=9 style=|Big Ten regular season

|-
!colspan=9 style=|Big Ten tournament

|- 
!colspan=9 style=|NCAA tournament

Player statistics 

Source

Rankings

Source

Awards and honors
 Maurice Ager – All Big Ten Second Team (Media), All Big Ten Third Team (Coaches)
 Paul Davis – All Big Ten Second Team
 Shannon Brown – All Big Ten Second Team

References

Michigan State Spartans men's basketball seasons
Michigan State Spartans
Michigan State Spartans men's basketball
Michigan State Spartans men's basketball
Michigan State